The Looting of the Eastern Mausoleum was an incident in which some of the major mausoleums of the Chinese Qing dynasty in the Eastern Qing tombs were looted by troops under the command of the warlord Sun Dianying.

Prelude
In the early hours of June 8, 1928, warlord Sun Dianying led his army into the Eastern Mausoleums of the Qing dynasty in Malanyu, northwest of Zunhua, Hebei. This was the final resting place of the Qing emperors and empresses, and was about 120 kilometers (75 miles) from the Forbidden City of Peking. The 78-square-kilometer (30.1-square-mile) burial site was for five emperors, 15 empresses and 136 imperial concubines within 15 tombs, including the Shunzhi Emperor (1638–1661), the Kangxi Emperor (1654–1722), the Qianlong Emperor (1711–1799) and Empress Dowager Cixi (1835–1908).

Looting operation
On June 12, 1928, Sun Dianying ordered a large-scale graverobbing operation that removed almost all the underground funeral objects of the Huifeiling and Yuling Mausoleums and the underground palace of Puxiangyu East Dingling. Ma Futian, Regimental Commander in the 28th Army of Zhang Zuolin, had quietly occupied Malanyu. Sun Dianying ordered Tan Wenjiang, one of his division commanders, to capture the tomb area. At dawn on July 2, Ma Futian was driven away and Tan's army looted the mausoleums in Malanyu. After that, Sun's army went straight to the area of the Eastern Qing Tombs, pretending to engage in war exercises in the area. Tan Wenjiang placed policemen all around, denying access to the area and signs declared the army was "protecting the Tombs" to prevent interference.

The looting operation was directed by Sun Dianying from his car. Trucks were on hand to speed away with the loot as soon as they were loaded. At midnight the engineering corps blew up the entrance, opening the passage leading to the underground palace. The stone door was pried open to give access to the rear room of the grave. Sun gave first priority to officers above battalion commander level to collect treasure for themselves. Ordinary soldiers were eventually allowed to take the leftovers.

The robbers first took the large treasure objects placed around the remains of Empress Dowager Cixi, such as jadeite watermelons, grasshoppers and vegetables, jade lotus and coral. They snatched objects found beneath the body and ravaged the corpse itself, taking her imperial robe; tearing off her undergarments, shoes and socks, and taking all the pearls and jewels on her body. The looters even pried open her jaws and took the rare pearl from her mouth. Ultimately, they looted the objects under the coffin that had been favorites of Cixi when she was alive.

While Tan Wenjiang was robbing Cixi's tomb, Han Dabao, a brigade commander under Sun Dianying, led another group to the Yuling Mausoleum and declared his intention to conduct a war exercise. They blew the entrance and doorways of the underground palace and rushed into the tomb. The coffins of the Qianlong Emperor and his empress and four concubines were pried open, all the valuables looted and the skeletons thrown into the mud. The soldiers then rushed to the Yuling Mausoleum and the underground palace of Puxiangyu East Dingling and looted what they could.

Newspapers reported the graverobbing and the news spread throughout China and around the world. People were outraged. China's dethroned last emperor Puyi, who had dismissed Sun from his post, sent telegrams to Chiang Kai-shek; Yan Xishan, Commander of Garrison Force in Beijing; the Central Committee of Kuomintang and local newspapers asking them to punish Sun Dianying severely. Many others also called for punishment. However, Sun Dianying bribed those who were in a position to discipline him and nothing was done.

After removing the treasures from the graves, Sun and his army sealed the empty chambers with stones. They carted off some of China's greatest treasures, but some things could not be easily removed and the imposing buildings of the mausoleum still survive.

Gallery

References

Warlord Era
Qing dynasty
Eastern Mausoleum
1928 in China
1928 crimes in China